Agios Georgios (Greek: Άγιος Γεώργιος meaning Saint George) is a village and a former municipality on the island of Corfu, Ionian Islands, Greece. Since the 2019 local government reform it is part of the municipality North Corfu, of which it is a municipal unit. The seat of the municipality was the town of Agros (pop. 271). The largest towns are Kavvadades (pop. 517), Agros, Pagoi (304), Rachtades (179), Chorepiskopoi (203), and Afionas (294).

Subdivisions
The municipal unit Agios Georgios is subdivided into the following communities (constituent villages in brackets):
Agros (Agros, Aspiotades, Manatades, Rafalades)
Agios Athanasios
Arkadades
Armenades (Armenades, Agios Georgios, Termenades)
Afionas (Afionas, Afionitika)
Dafni (Dafni, Gavrades)
Drosato
Kavvadades (Kavvadades, Arillas, Saoulatika)
Kastelannoi Gyrou (Kastelannoi, Troumpettas)
Mesaria (Mesaria, Kopsocheilades)
Pagoi (Pagoi, Agios Georgios Pagon, Prinylas, Vatonies)
Rachtades
Chorepiskopoi

Population

See also
List of settlements in the Corfu regional unit

References

External links
Agios Georgios on GTP Travel Pages

Populated places in Corfu (regional unit)
Beaches of Greece
Seaside resorts in Greece